Interface or interfacing may refer to:

Academic journals  
 Interface (journal), by the Electrochemical Society
 Interface, Journal of Applied Linguistics, now merged with ITL International Journal of Applied Linguistics
 Interface: A Journal for and About Social Movements
 Interfaces (journal), now INFORMS Journal on Applied Analytics

Arts and entertainment
 Interface (album), by Dominion, 1996
 Interface (band), an American music group
 Interface (film), a 1984 American film
 Interface (novel), by Stephen Bury (a pseudonym), 1994
 "Interface" (Star Trek: The Next Generation), an episode of the TV series
 Interface series, a science fiction horror story in short installments on Reddit

Science, social science and technology

Computing and electronics

 Interface (computing), a shared boundary between system components
 Interface (Java)
 Interface (object-oriented programming)
 Application binary interface, between two binary program modules
 Application programming interface, between a client and a server 
 Network interface, between two pieces of equipment or protocol layers in a computer network
 User interface, between humans and machines
 Graphical user interface
Audio and video interfaces and connectors

Other uses in science and social science
 Interface (communication studies), in the work environment
 Interface (matter), in the physical sciences
 Biointerface, in inorganic/organic material
 Business interoperability interface, between organizational systems
 Social interface, a concept in social science

Other uses 
 Interface, Inc., a flooring manufacturer
 Interface:2010, or Interface, an international-standard-setting body in marketing
 Interfacing, a textile used on the unseen side of fabrics for rigidity
 Interface, a lost Vocaloid song by Japanese producer -MASA Works DESIGN-, depicting a schoolgirl (depicted by Kagamine Rin) killing her schoolmate (depicted by Hatsune Miku) out of jealousy.

See also 

 Boundary (disambiguation)
 Interface area, where segregated nationalist and unionist areas meet in Northern Ireland